The Chapel of Saint Helena could refer to:

 Chapel of Saint Helena, Betlehem
 Chapel of Saint Helena, Slovakia
 Chapel of Saint Helena, Jerusalem

See also
Chapel of St Helen, in Wicken Bonhunt, England
St Helen's Chapel in Colchester, England.